Ferrigno Glacier is a broad glacier on the north side of Rampart Ridge, Victoria Land, Antarctica, flowing west-northwest from Mount Lynch and Bishop Peak to the vicinity of The Spire. It was named by the Advisory Committee on Antarctic Names in 1994 after Jane G. Ferrigno, a United States Geological Survey geologist, a specialist in the use of satellite imagery to study and map Antarctica, and other ice and snow areas throughout the world. She was co-editor (with Richard S. Williams, Jr.) of the Satellite Image Atlas of Glaciers of the World.

References 

Glaciers of Victoria Land
Scott Coast